Malinda Abhishek (born 17 October 1998) is a Sri Lankan cricketer. He made his Twenty20 debut for Police Sports Club in the 2018–19 SLC Twenty20 Tournament on 16 February 2019. He made his List A debut on 1 April 2021, for Burgher Recreation Club in the 2020–21 Major Clubs Limited Over Tournament.

References

External links
 

1998 births
Living people
Sri Lankan cricketers
Burgher Recreation Club cricketers
Sri Lanka Police Sports Club cricketers